Rashad Azizli (born on 1 January 1994) isan Azerbaijani professional footballer who plays as a goalkeeper for Zira in the Azerbaijan Premier League.

Club career
On 31 January 2016, Azizli made his debut in the Azerbaijan Premier League for Ravan Baku match against Khazar Lankaran.

On 19 July 2020, Azizli signed one-year contract with Zira FK.

Personal life
Azizli is the son of former Azerbaijani goalkeeper Faig Azizov.

References

External links
 

1994 births
Living people
Association football goalkeepers
Azerbaijani footballers
Azerbaijan youth international footballers
Azerbaijan Premier League players
Ravan Baku FC players
AZAL PFK players
Sabail FK players
Neftçi PFK players
Sumgayit FK players
Shamakhi FK players
Zira FK players